HMS Cutlass is a  fast patrol boat of the British Royal Navy. She is a fast patrol boat with a maximum speed around  designed for sovereignty protection and coastal security duties. She arrived in Gibraltar in November 2021 after undergoing sea trials in Liverpool. The boat was formally handed over to the Royal Navy in March 2022.

Along with HMS Dagger, she is replacing the  patrol vessels in Gibraltar. The Scimitar-class boats were deployed in Gibraltar after 2003 but were withdrawn from the territory in 2020, being then replaced by two Archer-class boats on an interim basis until the arrival of the Cutlass-class vessels.

On 4 May 2022, she was commissioned into the Royal Navy.

See also
 British Forces Gibraltar

References

2021 ships
Ships built in the United Kingdom
Cutlass-class patrol vessels